Costaki Anthopoulos (1835–1902), was an Ottoman Greek academic and statesman.

Life
He became a professor at the Ottoman Naval Academy; then entered the legal branch of the Turkish service, rising to the post of imperial procurator at the court of cassation. He was governor-general of Crete; and, in 1895, was appointed Ottoman ambassador in London, a post which he continued to hold until his death at Constantinople in 1902.

He bore throughout his career the reputation of an intelligent and upright public servant.

In June 1902, the Sultan conferred on him the decoration Nisan-i Iftihar (Order of Glory) in diamonds, in recognition of the loyal services rendered by him to the Ottoman Empire.

References

Attribution:

1835 births
1902 deaths
Greeks from the Ottoman Empire
Pashas
Ottoman governors of Crete
Diplomats of the Ottoman Empire
Ambassadors of the Ottoman Empire to the United Kingdom
19th-century diplomats
20th-century diplomats
Members of the Senate of the Ottoman Empire
Constantinopolitan Greeks
Politicians from Istanbul
Diplomats from Istanbul
Academics from Istanbul
Lawyers from Istanbul